Panaiotis, also known as Peter Ward, is an American vocalist and composer, currently living in Albuquerque. He received his Master of Music degree from New England Conservatory and a Ph.D. in music from the University of California, San Diego.

He has collaborated with composer and accordionist Pauline Oliveros, together co-founding the Deep Listening Band, and Indian santurist Nandkishor Muley.

Discography
The Ballad of Frankie Silver (1994)
Rising Sun (2001), with Nandkishor Muley

Performer
Deep Listening (1989)
The Ready Made Boomerang (1991)
Troglodyte's Delight (1990)

Musical software
In 2014, Panaiotis brought his software and compositional talents to create *Bandojo, an app that lets novices create melodies in accompaniment with musical textures, and jam together with friends. The iOS version was done in collaboration with Andrew Stone.

References

External links
Homepage
Epitonic.com: Deep Listening Band featuring "Suiren" from self-titled album

Year of birth missing (living people)
Living people
American male singers
American male composers